Hata Dam is a gravity dam located in Yamaguchi prefecture in Japan. The dam is used for irrigation. The catchment area of the dam is 6.2 km2. The dam impounds about 10  ha of land when full and can store 637 thousand cubic meters of water. The construction of the dam was completed in 1971.

References

Dams in Yamaguchi Prefecture
1971 establishments in Japan